Gary G. Yerkey, born in Chicago, is an American author and journalist currently based in Washington, D.C., contributing to The Christian Science Monitor and other publications.

Career 
A graduate of Ripon College with B.A. in philosophy, he later undertook post-graduate work at the American University of Beirut and spent more than a decade in Europe and the Middle East, reporting for Time Life, ABC News, The Christian Science Monitor, the International Herald Tribune and other U.S. news organizations. He was also a staff reporter for Bloomberg BNA covering Congress and the Executive Branch. He has reported from India, Morocco, Malaysia, China, Singapore, Colombia, Canada, Poland, Latvia, Estonia and many other countries and has interviewed and written profiles of dozens of famous and not-so-famous individuals—from influential jazz drummer Art Taylor to civil rights movement icon John Lewis and award-winning Mexican poet and environmental activist Homero Aridjis.  He has also served in the United States Air Force and is a former pilot.

Awards
In 2015, he was among the "foot soldiers" of the civil rights movement who received the Congressional Gold Medal—the nation's highest civilian award—for their participation in the 1965 Selma to Montgomery marches, led by John Lewis and Martin Luther King Jr.

Works
Still Time to Live:  A Biography of Jack Belden, 
South to Selma:  'Outside Agitators' and the Civil Rights March that Changed America, 
Dying for the News:  Honoring Tom Treanor and the Other Reporters Killed Covering World War II, 
A Pilot's Pilot:  Gen. Caleb V. Haynes and the Rise of American Air Power, 1917-1944, 
A Fever in My Blood:  The American Life and Tragic Death of Darrell Berrigan, 
The Two Wars of Bruce C. Hopper:  From WW I Bomber Pilot to WW II Spy, 
Troublemakers: On the March for Civil Rights From Selma to Black Power,

References

Living people
People from Chicago
American male non-fiction writers
People from Washington, D.C.
Ripon College (Wisconsin) alumni
Journalists from Illinois
American civil rights activists
Selma to Montgomery marches
Congressional Gold Medal recipients
Academic staff of the American University of Beirut
The Christian Science Monitor people
ABC News people
American male journalists
Year of birth missing (living people)